Koleta Maramanitavuto Likuculacula (born 17 August 2000) is a Fijian footballer who plays as a forward for Ba FC and the Fiji women's national team.

In August 2018 she was named to the Fijian team for the 2018 OFC Women's Nations Cup.

Notes

References

2000 births
Living people
Women's association football forwards
Fijian women's footballers
Fiji women's international footballers